Leixlip Louisa Bridge is a railway station in the north-eastern corner of County Kildare, Ireland. It is one of two stations that serve the civil parish of Leixlip, the other being Leixlip Confey. Both stations lie on the Dublin to Maynooth commuter route. It is one of the few stations in the Iarnród Éireann network in which the station building is located directly over the platforms, on a bridge (Dún Laoghaire railway station also follows this design).

Location and access

The station is located west of the town centre, on the R148 regional road.

History

Originally named Louisa Bridge & Leixlip when it opened on 1 September 1848 the station was known simply as Leixlip from 1851, until the opening of Leixlip Confey railway station in 1990.

The station was upgraded to two platforms as part of the Western Commuter upgrade project in the early 2000s. At the same time it was reconstructed to be disability-friendly. The previous station building is now a dwelling house. The 1980s concrete block station building remains, albeit out of use, and is the only remaining station building of this style from the 1980s re-opening of the Western Commuter line.

See also 
 List of railway stations in Ireland
 Rail transport in Ireland

References

External links 

 Irish Rail Leixlip (Louisa Bridge) Station Website

Leixlip
Iarnród Éireann stations in County Kildare
Railway stations opened in 1848
1848 establishments in Ireland
Railway stations in the Republic of Ireland opened in 1848